Raymond Bryan Dillard (January 7, 1944 – October 1, 1993) was a professor of Old Testament language and literature at Westminster Theological Seminary.

Life

Dillard was born on January 7, 1944, in Louisville, Kentucky, the son of Raymond and Ruth Dillard. After graduating from high school in Fayetteville, North Carolina, in 1962, he went to study at Bob Jones University (B.A. 1966), Westminster Theological Seminary (B.D. 1969), and Dropsie University (Ph.D. 1975). He did postdoctoral research at Temple University, the University of Pennsylvania, and Tel Aviv University. He taught at Westminster Theological Seminary as professor of Old Testament language and literature from 1971 until his death in 1993.

Dillard was a member of the Society of Biblical Literature, where he worked in the Chronicles-Ezra-Nehemia section. He also held memberships in the Evangelical Theological Society and in the Institute for Biblical Research.

Among his major academic publications were an extensive commentary on 2 Chronicles published as part of the Word Biblical Commentary , a commentary on the Book of Joel , and his magnum opus, An Introduction to the Old Testament, which he wrote together with Tremper Longman and which was published posthumously, three months after his death .

To his students and colleagues, he was known as a "master of classroom drama" who "captivated mind and hearts".

Dillard died of a heart attack on October 1, 1993, in the woods near Zionsville, Pennsylvania.

Publications

Books and book chapters

Articles

Audio

References

1944 births
1993 deaths
20th-century biblical scholars
American biblical scholars
American Calvinist and Reformed theologians
American Presbyterian ministers
Bob Jones University alumni
Dropsie College alumni
Dropsie College faculty
Old Testament scholars
Orthodox Presbyterian Church members
Orthodox Presbyterian Church ministers
Religious leaders from Louisville, Kentucky
Academic staff of Tel Aviv University
Temple University faculty
University of Pennsylvania faculty
Westminster Theological Seminary alumni
Westminster Theological Seminary faculty
20th-century American non-fiction writers
20th-century American clergy